Pławna may refer to the following places in Poland:
Pławna, Lower Silesian Voivodeship (south-west Poland)
Pławna, Lesser Poland Voivodeship (south Poland)